North Inch is a large public park in Perth, Scotland. About 54 hectares in size, it is one of two "Inches" in Perth, the other being the smaller, 31-hectare South Inch, located half a mile across the city. The inches were granted to the city, when it was a royal burgh, by King Robert II in 1374. Both inches were once islands in the River Tay; today, they are connected by Tay Street, part of the A989.

The inch was the site of the "Battle of the Clans" in 1396.

Balhousie Castle and Bell's Sports Centre are located on its western edge.

A path circumnavigates the entire park.

Overlooking the southern edge of the Inch is the Old Academy, built between 1803 and 1807.

Perth Bridge, which is also known as Smeaton's Bridge and the Old Bridge, is nearby.

Three years after her husband's death in 1861, Queen Victoria unveiled a statue of Albert, Prince Consort, at the Inch. The couple and their children had stayed at the city's Royal George Hotel in 1848. It was their first time staying in a hotel, an occurrence prompted by their inability to stay at nearby Scone Palace because William Murray, 4th Earl of Mansfield, was out of town.

Another statue, an obelisk near the river bank, commemorates the 90th Regiment of Foot, the Perthshire Volunteers, alias the Grey Breeks. It was unveiled by Garnet Wolseley, 1st Viscount Wolseley, on 8 December 1896.

Unveiled in 1995, the 51st (Highland) Division War Memorial commemorates the soldiers of that infantry lost in World War II.

A bandstand formerly stood to the west of the obelisk, a gift of James Pullar.

Sports
Several sports take place on various parts of the Inch, including cricket, rugby and golf.

Golf

There is a reference to King James IV playing golf in Perth in 1504, despite a recently passed law prohibiting the game.

King James VI Golf Club was formed in 1858, and held its matches on the Inch until 1897. After a dispute with the tenant of Muirton over grazing rights had led to the temporary loss of the extension to the Inch course, it opened its own, laid out by "Old" Tom Morris, then of Prestwick, on Moncreiffe Island.

In 1861, the town council planted trees on the Inch as an amenity for the public. The patrons of the Inch's golf course, not appreciative of the interference the trees would cause in their rounds, uprooted them. The council decided not to replace them.

In 1864 and 1866, the Inch was the venue for two open tournaments. That of 1864 was won by Old Tom Morris. His son, "Young" Tom Morris, played in the same tournament.

The golf course has had eighteen holes since 1892.

Rugby
Perthshire RFC, formed in 1868, plays its home games on the Inch. As of 2021, the club are members of Scottish National League Division Three.

Cricket

The first recorded cricket match held on the ground came in 1849, when Perth played Grange.  The ground held its first first-class match when Scotland played Ireland in 1909.  Five further first-class matches were played there, the last of which came in 1970 when Scotland played Ireland.  Other first-class matches had seen the ground host the Australians in 1912, Wales in 1923, and the South Africans in 1929.  The ground held its first List A match when Scotland played Yorkshire in the 1984 Benson & Hedges Cup.  Three further List A matches were played there, the last of which saw Scotland play Lancashire in the 1989 Benson & Hedges Cup.  In the 1986 Benson & Hedges Cup Scotland historically defeated Lancashire, marking their first defeat of county opposition in limited-overs cricket.

In recent history the ground has become the victim of repeated vandalism and lack of funds. This led, in 2009, to the extinction of Perth County Cricket Club, which played at North Inch.

Gallery

References

External links
North Inch at Perth and Kinross Council's website
Perth North Inch (Perth and Kinross) - Scotland's Landscape, BBC
North Inch Golf Course website
North Inch, Perth at CricketArchive

Sports venues in Perth, Scotland
Golf clubs and courses in Perth and Kinross
Cricket grounds in Scotland
Parks in Perth, Scotland
Tourist attractions in Perth, Scotland